Andrey Vdovin (also transliterated Andrei Vdovin, born 26 February 1994) is a Russian parasport athlete competing mainly in category T37 sprint and middle-distance events. A triple gold medal winner at the 2013 IPC Athletics World Championships, Vdovin also set three world records in his class between 2013 and 2014.

Personal history
Vdovin was born in Dzerzhinsk, Russia in 1994. He has cerebral palsy. After leaving secondary education he enrolled at the Nizhny Novgorod State Technical University to study Information Technology.

Athletics career
Vdovin took up athletics at the age of 10 and later joined the Specialised Children's Youth Sport School of Olympic Reserve in Zarya. He was classified as a T37 athlete, due to limited motor function resulting from his cerebral palsy. In 2013 he was selected to represent Russia at the IPC World Championships in Lyon. There he entered three events, the 100m, 200m and the 4 × 100 m - T35-38. He won gold in all three and set a world record in both the 100m (11.48) and the 200m (22.77). His winning time in the 200m saw him become the first man to run under 23 seconds in his classification. In the T35-38 100m relay, he was joined by Gocha Khugaev, Roman Kapranov and Evgenii Shvetcov, beating South Africa (silver) and Ukraine (bronze) in the final.

The following year he represented Russia at Nottwil in Switzerland in an open meet. There he entered the 400m middle-distance event where his time of 51.67 not only gave him the gold medal, but also set a new world record. Three months later he was back in the Russian team at the 2014 IPC Athletics European Championships in Swansea. He entered the 100m and 200m sprint events along with and the 400m. Vdovin won both the sprint events and broke his own world record in the 400m with a time of 50.91 seconds.

Notes

External links
  (archive)

1994 births
Living people
World record holders in Paralympic athletics
Russian male sprinters
Russian male middle-distance runners
Track and field athletes with cerebral palsy
World Para Athletics Championships winners
Athletes (track and field) at the 2020 Summer Paralympics
Paralympic gold medalists for the Russian Paralympic Committee athletes
Paralympic silver medalists for the Russian Paralympic Committee athletes
People from Dzerzhinsk, Russia
Sportspeople from Nizhny Novgorod Oblast